Aspergillus baeticus is a species of fungus in the genus Aspergillus. It is from the Usti section. The species was first described in 2014.

References 

porphyreostipitatus
Fungi described in 2014